Stafford Borough Council elections are held every four years. Stafford Borough Council is the local authority for the non-metropolitan district of Stafford in Staffordshire, England. Since the last boundary changes in 2015, 40 councillors have been elected from 23 wards.

Political control
The town of Stafford had been a municipal borough from 1836 to 1974 with a borough council. The first elections to the enlarged borough of Stafford created under the Local Government Act 1972 were held in 1973, initially operating as a shadow authority until the new arrangements came into effect on 1 April 1974. Political control of the council since 1974 has been held by the following parties:

Leadership
The leaders of the council since 1974 have been:

Council elections
1973 Stafford Borough Council election
1976 Stafford Borough Council election
1979 Stafford Borough Council election (New ward boundaries)
1983 Stafford Borough Council election
1987 Stafford Borough Council election
1991 Stafford Borough Council election
1995 Stafford Borough Council election (Borough boundary changes took place but the number of seats remained the same)
1999 Stafford Borough Council election
2003 Stafford Borough Council election (New ward boundaries reduced the number of seats by one)
2007 Stafford Borough Council election
2011 Stafford Borough Council election
2015 Stafford Borough Council election (New ward boundaries)
2019 Stafford Borough Council election

By-election results

1995-1999

1999-2003

2003-2007

2007-2011

2011-2015

References

 Stafford election results
 By-election results

External links
Stafford Borough Council

 
Council elections in Staffordshire
District council elections in England